A Canadian Forces base or CFB is a military installation of the Canadian Armed Forces. For a facility to qualify as a Canadian Forces base, it must station one or more major units (e.g., army regiments, navy ships, air force wings).

Minor installations are named Canadian Forces station or CFS. A Canadian Forces station could host a single minor unit (e.g., an early-warning radar station). Many of these facilities are now decommissioned for administrative purposes and function as detachments of a larger Canadian Forces base nearby.

Current

Canadian Army
Note: Primary lodger units at Canadian Forces Bases used by the Canadian Army are regiments of the Canadian Army.

Alberta:

 CFB Edmonton
 CFB Suffield
 CFB Wainwright

Manitoba:

 CFB Shilo

New Brunswick:

 CFB Gagetown

Ontario:

 CFB Kingston
 CFB Borden
 CFB Petawawa

Quebec:

 CFB Montreal
 CFB Valcartier

Royal Canadian Navy
Note: Primary lodger units at Canadian Forces Bases used by the Royal Canadian Navy are individual commissioned ships of the RCN.

British Columbia:

 CFB Esquimalt
Nova Scotia:

 CFB Halifax
Nunavut:

 Naval Facility Nanisivik

Royal Canadian Air Force
Note: Primary lodger units at Canadian Forces Bases used by the Royal Canadian Air Force are wings of the RCAF.

Alberta:

 CFB Cold Lake

British Columbia:

 CFB Comox

Manitoba:

 CFB Winnipeg (CFAD Dundurn)

Newfoundland and Labrador:

 CFB Gander
 CFB Goose Bay

Nova Scotia:

 CFB Greenwood

Ontario:

 CFB Kingston
 CFB Borden
 CFB North Bay
 CFB Trenton (CFD Mountain View)

Quebec:

 CFB Bagotville

Saskatchewan:

 CFB Moose Jaw
The RCAF supplies aircraft to Canadian Joint Operations Command, which frequently operate from a chain of forward operating locations (FOLs) at various civilian airfields across northern Canada, capable of supporting RCAF operations. CF-18 Hornets, CP-140 Auroras and various transport and search and rescue aircraft periodically deploy to these FOLs for short training exercises, Arctic sovereignty patrols, aid to the civil power, or search and rescue operations.

All services

Newfoundland and Labrador

 CFS St. John's

Northwest Territories

 CFNA HQ Yellowknife

Nunavut

 CFS Alert

Ontario

 Department of National Defence Headquarters, Ottawa
 NDHQ Carling, Ottawa
 CFS Leitrim, Ottawa
 Connaught Range and Primary Training Centre (CRPTC), Ottawa

Quebec

 Canadian Forces Leadership and Recruit School (CFLRS)

Yukon

 CFNA HQ Whitehorse

Closed

Defunct bases

Alberta:
 CFB Calgary (portion of property currently hosts 41 Canadian Brigade Group Headquarters (Waters Building), 41 Combat Engineer Regiment (Currie Building) and 41 Service Battalion (Currie Building).
 CFB Penhold

British Columbia:
 CFB Chilliwack (portion of property currently hosts ASU Chilliwack)

Manitoba:
 CFB Winnipeg (Kapyong Barracks)
 CFB Portage La Prairie
 CFB Rivers

New Brunswick:
 CFB Chatham
 CFB Moncton (portion of property currently hosts CFB Gagetown - Detachment Moncton)

Nova Scotia:
 CFB Cornwallis
 CFB Shearwater (Shearwater Heliport now part of CFB Halifax)

Ontario:
 CFB Clinton
 CFB Centralia
 CFB Downsview (portion of property currently hosts ASU Toronto)
 CFB London (Wolseley Barracks) (portion of property currently hosts ASU London)
 CFB Picton
 CFB Rockcliffe
 CFB Uplands

Prince Edward Island
 CFB Summerside

Quebec:
 CFB St. Hubert
 CFB St. Jean (now home to the CF Leadership and Recruit School, a lodger unit of CFB Montreal)

Other:
 CFB Baden-Soellingen, Germany
 CFB Lahr, Germany

Defunct stations

Alberta:
 CFS Beaverlodge

British Columbia:
 CFS Aldergrove
 CFS Baldy Hughes
 CFS Holberg
 CFS Kamloops
 CFS Ladner
 CFS Masset (now a detachment of CFS Leitrim)

Manitoba:
 CFS Beausejour
 CFS Churchill
 CFS Flin Flon
 CFS Gypsumville

New Brunswick:
 CFS Coverdale
 CFS Renous
 CFS St. Margarets

Nova Scotia:
 CFS Barrington
 CFS Debert
 CFS Mill Cove
 CFS Newport Corner
 CFS Shelburne
 CFS Sydney

Newfoundland and Labrador:

 CFS Gander (Now CFB Gander)
 CFS Goose Bay (Now CFB Goose Bay)
 CFS Saglek

Northwest Territories:
 CFS Inuvik

Nunavut:
 CFS Frobisher Bay

Ontario:
 CFS Armstrong
 CFS Carp
 CFS Cobourg
 CFS Falconbridge
 CFS Foymount
 CFS Gloucester
 CFS Lowther
 CFS Moosonee
 CFS Ramore
 CFS Sioux Lookout

Quebec:
 CFS Chibougamau
 CFS Moisie
 CFS Mont Apica
 CFS Lac St. Denis
 CFS Senneterre
 RCAF Station Parent
 CFS Val-d'Or

Saskatchewan:
 CFS Alsask
 CFS Dana
 CFS Yorkton

Yukon:
 CFS Whitehorse

Other:
 CFS Bermuda, Bermuda

The Canadian Forces were reduced during the 1990s from a high of 90,000 personnel in the late 1980s to the present force levels.  Coinciding with personnel and equipment reductions was the politically controversial decision to close a number of bases and stations which were obsolete or created duplication.

A small number of these "closed" facilities have actually continued operating as before; but, because of cost and administrative efficiency—or, in the case of radio and radar facilities, automation—, they have been absorbed into other nearby bases and therefore do not qualify for separate designations. For example, the CF Leadership and Recruit School at St. Jean, Quebec, is now a lodger unit of CFB Montreal, and the former CFS Masset is a detachment of CFS Leitrim. Other facilities are now used as training grounds for reserve/militia units.

See also

 List of Royal Canadian Air Force stations
 List of Royal Canadian Navy stations

References